Kristen Iversen is an American writer of nonfiction and fiction. Her books include Full Body Burden: Growing Up in the Nuclear Shadow of Rocky Flats , Molly Brown: Unraveling the Myth and Shadow Boxing: Art and Craft in Creative Nonfiction, as well as the anthologies Don't Look Now: Things We Wish We Hadn't Seen and Doom with a View: Historical and Cultural Contexts of the Rocky Flats Nuclear Weapons Plant. She is a Professor in English and Creative Writing at the University of Cincinnati and Literary Nonfiction Editor of The Cincinnati Review. Iversen was chosen to be a Fulbright Scholar at the University of Bergen, Norway in 2020-2021.

Life and work 
Kristen Iversen was born in Des Moines, Iowa, and grew up in Arvada, Colorado, near the Rocky Flats nuclear weaponry facility. Her father was a small-town attorney and her mother worked as a public health nurse. The eldest of four children, Iversen attended Colorado State University and then transferred to the University of Colorado at Boulder, where she received a BA in English/Creative Writing. She worked as a travel writer in Europe for several years before returning to the states to earn a Ph.D. in English and Creative Writing from the University of Denver.

Iversen has taught at universities around the country, including the MFA programs at San Jose State University and Naropa University. She served as director of the MFA Program in Creative Writing at the University of Memphis and as editor-in-chief of The Pinch, an award-winning literary journal. During the summers, she has taught in the MFA Low-Residency Program at the University of New Orleans, held in San Miguel de Allende, Mexico, and Edinburgh, Scotland. She is also a Faculty Mentor in the Mile High MFA program at Regis University in Denver, Colorado.  As of August 2014, Iversen teaches in the Ph.D. program in Creative Writing at the University of Cincinnati, where she also serves as Literary Nonfiction Editor of The Cincinnati Review and was a Fellow at the Taft Research Center. She also serves as Director of the Prose, Poetry, and Passion Seminar in San Miguel de Allende, Mexico.

She is the author of Full Body Burden: Growing Up in the Nuclear Shadow of Rocky Flats, a book of memoir and investigative journalism that traces her experience of growing up in a small Colorado community near Rocky Flats, a secret nuclear weapons plant once designated as “the most contaminated site in America.”  Iversen later worked at the plant herself.  Full Body Burden won the 2013 Colorado Book Award and the Reading the West Book Award in Nonfiction.  It was also chosen one of the Best Books of 2012 by Kirkus Reviews and the American Library Association, and 2012 Best Book about Justice by The Atlantic. The book was a finalist for the Barnes & Noble Discover Award and the Andrew Carnegie Medal for Excellence. In 2012, an excerpt from Full Body Burden was published in the June 11th edition of The Nation. Many universities have chosen Full Body Burden for their First Year Experience/Common Read programs and it has been translated into several languages. This book is being made into a forthcoming documentary film, Full Body Burden, and it has been optioned for a television series.

Iversen also edited an anthology of essays and articles about Rocky Flats by various experts around the country entitled Doom with a View: Historical and Cultural Contexts of Rocky Flats, published in October 2020. A collection of literary essays, Don't Look Now: Things We Wish We Hadn't Seen, co-edited with David Lazar, was published in November 2020 and features the work of leading writers of literary nonfiction.

Iversen's textbook, Shadow Boxing: Art and Craft in Creative Nonfiction, was the first in its field to cover the subgenres of creative nonfiction. Her first book, Molly Brown: Unraveling the Myth, is a biography of Margaret Tobin Brown, known to history as “the Unsinkable Molly Brown.”  The book won the Colorado Book Award for Biography and the Barbara Sudler Award for Nonfiction and formed the basis for seven documentaries, including the A&E Biography Molly Brown: An American Legend and Molly Brown: Biography of a Changing Nation. A new edition of the book was published in 2018. In 2020, a revival of the musical The Unsinkable Molly Brown opened in New York, based on Iversen's book. Iversen's essays and stories have appeared in The New York Times, The Guardian, The American Scholar, and many other publications. In 2023 she was awarded a Taft Fellowship for Fall 2023 in support of a book-in-progress on the KKK in the West.

Kristen Iversen is currently completing a literary biography of Nikola Tesla entitled Friend and Faithful Stranger: Nikola Tesla in the Gilded Age, which has involved extensive research trips throughout the United States and Europe.

Iversen is married to George Vujnovich, a pilot, and she has two grown sons. She divides her time between Cincinnati, Ohio and Westcliffe, Colorado.

Full Body Burden summary 
Full Body Burden: Growing Up in the Nuclear Shadow of Rocky Flats is a 2012 work of memoir and investigative journalism fusing Iversen's personal story of growing up in Cold War America with the history of the former Rocky Flats Nuclear Plant near Denver, Colorado, once called by the Department of Energy “the most contaminated site in America.” 

From 1952 to 1989 there were many fires, leaks, and other mishaps at Rocky Flats. The area became severely contaminated, and little attention was paid to containment and environmental remediation. Carl J. Johnson, director of health between 1973 and 1981, led research into contamination levels and adverse effects on public health, until his employment was terminated. His research results were supported and confirmed by many subsequent studies.

Recent studies indicate that areas on and near the Rocky Flats site are still contaminated with plutonium and may pose a significant health risk.

Books 
Doom with a View: Historical and Cultural Contexts of Rocky Flats. Fulcrum Books, 2020.
Don't Look Now: Things We Wish We Hadn't Seen. Co-edited with David Lazar. Ohio State University Press, 2020.

See also 
Physicians for Social Responsibility Colorado’s Symposium on Rocky Flats: Impacts on the Environment and Health, April 23, 2022
Radioactive contamination from the Rocky Flats Plant
Dark Circle (film)
Making a Real Killing: Rocky Flats and the Nuclear West
Rocky Flats Truth Force
Nuclear and radiation accidents by country
Downwinders
www.kristeniversen.com

References

External links 
 Official website
 Kristen Iversen on NPR "Fresh Air"
 University of Memphis: Kristen Iversen garners national awards

American memoirists
American biographers
Living people
University of Colorado alumni
University of Denver alumni
American women memoirists
American women biographers
1958 births
21st-century American women